The German order of precedence is a symbolic hierarchy of the five highest federal offices in Germany used to direct protocol. It has no official status, but has been established in practical use.

 The President of Germany, the head of state of Germany.
 The President of the Bundestag, the speaker of the German parliament, the Bundestag.
 The Chancellor of Germany, the head of the government of Germany.
 (1.) The President of the Bundesrat, the speaker of the Bundesrat, a federal legislative chamber, in which the governments of the sixteen German states are represented. The president of the Bundesrat is ex officio also deputy to the President of Germany (Basic Law, Article 57), thus becomes first in the order, while acting on behalf of the President or while acting as head of state during a vacancy of the presidency.
 The President of the Federal Constitutional Court, the supreme court of Germany.

Current office-holders

Living former office-holders
The order of precedence is also observed with respect to former office-holders in some cases, for example if they participate in official ceremonies as honoured guests.

Horst Köhler, President of Germany (2004–2010)
Christian Wulff, President of Germany (2010–2012)
Joachim Gauck, President of Germany (2012–2017)
Rita Süssmuth, President of the Bundestag (1988–1998)
Wolfgang Thierse, President of the Bundestag (1998–2005)
Norbert Lammert, President of the Bundestag (2005–2017)
Wolfgang Schäuble, President of the Bundestag (2017–2021)
Gerhard Schröder, Chancellor of Germany (1998–2005), President of the Bundesrat (1997–1998)
Angela Merkel, Chancellor of Germany (2005–2021)
Bernhard Vogel, President of the Bundesrat (1976–1977 and 1987–1988)
Hans-Ulrich Klose, President of the Bundesrat (1979–1980)
Björn Engholm, President of the Bundesrat (1988–1989)
Walter Momper, President of the Bundesrat (1989–1990)
Berndt Seite, President of the Bundesrat (1992)
Oskar Lafontaine, President of the Bundesrat (1992–1993)
Klaus Wedemeier, President of the Bundesrat (1993–1994)
Edmund Stoiber, President of the Bundesrat (1995–1996)
Erwin Teufel, President of the Bundesrat (1996–1997)
Hans Eichel, President of the Bundesrat (1998–1999)
Roland Koch, President of the Bundesrat (1999)
Kurt Beck, President of the Bundesrat (2000–2001)
Klaus Wowereit, President of the Bundesrat (2001–2002)
Wolfgang Böhmer, President of the Bundesrat (2002–2003)
Dieter Althaus, President of the Bundesrat (2003–2004)
Matthias Platzeck, President of the Bundesrat (2004–2005)
Peter Harry Carstensen, President of the Bundesrat (2005–2006)
Ole von Beust, President of the Bundesrat (2007–2008)
Peter Müller, President of the Bundesrat (2008–2009)
Jens Böhrnsen, President of the Bundesrat (2009–2010)
Hannelore Kraft, President of the Bundesrat (2010–2011)
Horst Seehofer, President of the Bundesrat (2011–2012)
Winfried Kretschmann, President of the Bundesrat (2012–2013)
Stephan Weil, President of the Bundesrat (2013–2014)
Volker Bouffier, President of the Bundesrat (2014–2015)
Stanislaw Tillich, President of the Bundesrat (2015–2016)
Malu Dreyer, President of the Bundesrat (2016–2017)
Michael Müller, President of the Bundesrat (2017–2018)
Daniel Günther, President of the Bundesrat (2018–2019)
Dietmar Woidke, President of the Bundesrat (2019–2020)
Reiner Haseloff, President of the Bundesrat (2020–2021)
Bodo Ramelow, President of the Bundesrat (2021–2022)
Hans-Jürgen Papier, President of the Federal Constitutional Court (2002–2010)
Andreas Voßkuhle, President of the Federal Constitutional Court (2010–2020)

Notes

References

Germany
Government of Germany

de:Protokollarische Rangordnung#Deutschland